Acanthophila imperviella is a moth in the family Gelechiidae. It is found in Russia, where it is known only from the southern part of Primorsky Krai.

The wingspan is about 12 mm. The forewings are dark grey, with a light grey costal stroke at three-fourths of the wing length and relatively large spots at the middle and end of the cell, as well as dark strokes at one-fourth and at the middle of the anal fold. The hindwings are grey.

References

imperviella
Moths described in 2003
Moths of Asia